Adrián González Velasco (born 13 September 1992 in Burgos) is a Spanish former professional cyclist, who rode professionally between 2015 and 2018 for the  and  teams.

Major results
2016
 10th Boucles de l'Aulne

References

External links

1992 births
Living people
Spanish male cyclists
Sportspeople from Burgos
Cyclists from Castile and León